Grand Prairie High School is a public high school in Grand Prairie, Texas. It is one of two high schools serving the 37-campus Grand Prairie Independent School District, which encompasses the Dallas County portion of Grand Prairie.

History

Campus
Grand Prairie High School relocated to its current site at 101 Gopher Boulevard in January 1953, following the 1952 Christmas holidays.

Classroom facilities
Following construction of the original building in 1952, the school underwent its first expansion in the late 1970s. However, the classroom facilities in use today are mainly the product of a major expansion and renovation project completed in 1990. The project added a new library, administrative offices, classroom space, cafeteria, and gymnasium (see "Athletic facilities" below), as well as the atrium at the school's entrance.

Due to dramatic growth in the student population, GPHS opened a Ninth Grade Center in 2002 at the southwest corner of the campus. The high school and the Ninth Grade Center consolidated to begin the 2013–14 school year as the Ninth Grade Center was converted to the Grand Prairie Fine Arts Academy.

Athletic facilities
The Gopher Bowl (was constructed in 1956 in the northeast portion of the campus and hosts the school's home football games and soccer matches. Unlike many stadiums with "bowl" in their names, the stadium is an almost complete below-ground bowl (the northeast end is not enclosed). Since 1969, it has also been the site of the home football games of the South Grand Prairie High School Warriors. It was remodeled and expanded in 2003–2004 and re-dedicated as the Gopher-Warrior Bowl to recognize both high schools, to much dismay from Gopher alumni.

The school's coliseum was completed in 1990. The GPISD Board of Trustees re-dedicated it as the Amos Turner Gymnasium in 1998. Turner was principal of GPHS during the 1975–1976 school year and previously served as both a teacher and coach at GPHS from 1953 until 1968.

Performing arts facilities
The 2,000-seat H. H. Chambers Auditorium sits at the southeast corner of the campus and was dedicated in 1963. Chambers served as superintendent of the Grand Prairie Independent School District from 1950 to 1968.

The Leon Breeden Band Hall houses the school's music education program and honors former GPHS band director Leon Breeden. Following his tenure at GPHS, Breeden achieved international recognition as the director of the world-renowned jazz program at the University of North Texas College of Music.

Demographics
Grand Prairie High School had the following demographic profile during the 2009–2010 school year in grades 10–12:

Feeder schools 
The following elementary schools feed into Grand Prairie High School:
 Austin Elementary School
 Daniels Elementary School
 Eisenhower Elementary School
 Hector Garcia Elementary School
 Hobbs Williams Elementary School
 James Bowie Elementary School
 Juan Seguin Elementary School
 Milam Elementary School (partial)
 Sallye Moore Elementary School (partial)
 Sam Rayburn Elementary School (partial)
 Travis Elementary School

The following middle schools feed into Grand Prairie High School:
 Adams Middle School
 Bill Arnold Middle School Women's Leadership Academy 
 Kennedy Middle School
 James Fannin Middle School

Academic standards
In 2010, the school was rated "recognized" by the Texas Education Agency. In 2011, the school was rated "Academically Unacceptable" by the Texas Education Agency.

Achievements

UIL Academic State honors

UIL Athletic State honors

National Speech and Debate Tournament honors
From the National Speech and Debate Association:

Texas Forensic Association State Tournament honors
From the Texas Forensic Association:

Texas State Solo and Ensemble Contest State honors

Notable alumni

(includes Grand Prairie High School and Dalworth High School)
Rodney Anderson, member of the Texas House of Representatives from District 105; former member of the Texas House from District 106
Rhett Bomar, former NFL and Oklahoma quarterback 
Dennis Burkley, actor
Dave Clark, 1960 Olympian, Pole Vault
Jack T. Sanders, professor emeritus University of Oregon, prominent New Testament scholar, author of histories of eastern Oregon.https://belltowerfuneralhome.com/tribute/details/575/Jack-Sanders/obituary.html
Randy Galloway, retired Dallas/Fort Worth ESPN Radio host and Fort Worth Star-Telegram columnist
Lonnie Hannah, member of 2002 gold-medal-winning and 2006 bronze-medal-winning U.S. Paralympic sledge hockey team and flag bearer at closing ceremonies of 2006 Winter Paralympics
Michael Keasler, Texas Court of Criminal Appeals Judge
Keithen McCant, former Canadian Football League player
T. Michael Moseley, Chief of Staff of the United States Air Force (2005–2008)
E. P. Sanders, leading New Testament scholar and retired Duke University professor
Charley Taylor, member of Pro Football Hall of Fame and former Washington Redskins wide receiver.  Grand Prairie was segregated at the time. Charley Taylor went to dalworth high school.  
Kerry Wood, retired Major League Baseball pitcher and 1998 National League Rookie of the Year

 Ahmon Allen, Owner of "Kinfolk Nem Cookin'" and Philanthropist

References

External links
 Grand Prairie High School Alumni Association

Grand Prairie Independent School District high schools
Buildings and structures in Grand Prairie, Texas
1911 establishments in Texas
Educational institutions established in 1911